Dicroidium is an extinct genus of fork-leaved seed ferns that were widely distributed over Gondwana during the Triassic. Their fossils are known from South Africa, the Arabian Peninsula, Australia, New Zealand, South America, Madagascar, the Indian subcontinent and Antarctica. They were first discovered in Triassic sediments of Tasmania by Morris in 1845. Fossils from the Umm Irna Formation in Jordan and in Pakistan indicate that these plants already existed in Late Permian. Late surviving members of the genus are known from the Early Jurassic (Sinemurian) of East Antarctica. Within paleobotany, Dicroidium is a form genus used to refers to the leaves, associated with ovuluate organs classified as Umkomasia and pollen organs classified as Pteruchus, while Dicroidum is also used collectively to refer to the whole plant.

Description 
The leaves are similar to those of modern ferns but like all seed ferns (Pteridospermatophyta) were thick and had substantial cuticles. Dicroidium differs from other seed fern leaves in having a forked rachis; giving the appearance of two fern leaves joined at the base. These plants had male and female reproductive structures. Following the form generic nomenclature of paleobotany, male pollen-bearing structures are separately named Pteruchus and the female structures Umkomasia.

Whole plant reconstructions 
Different organs attributed to the same original plant can be reconstructed from co-occurrence at the same locality and from similarities in the stomatal apparatus and other anatomical peculiarities of fossilized cuticles. 
Dicroidium odontopteroides may have been produced by the same plant as Umkomasia macleanii (ovulate structures) and Pteruchus africanus (pollen organs).
Dicroidium zuberi may have been produced by the same plant as Umkomasia feistmantelii (ovulate structures) and Pteruchus barrealensis (pollen organs)

References

 Bomfleur, B. and Kerp, H. (2010). Dicroidium diversity in the Upper Triassic of north Victoria Land, East Antarctica.

Triassic plants
Fossil taxa described in 1912
Pteridospermatophyta